The Mont Blanc Tunnel is a highway tunnel between France and Italy, under the Mont Blanc mountain in the Alps. It links Chamonix, Haute-Savoie, France with Courmayeur, Aosta Valley, Italy, via the French Route Nationale 205 and the Italian Traforo T1 (forming the European route E25), in particular the motorways serving Geneva (A40 of France) and Turin (A5 of Italy). The passageway is one of the major trans-Alpine transport routes, particularly for Italy, which relies on this tunnel for transporting as much as one-third of its freight to northern Europe.

The agreement between France and Italy on building a tunnel was signed in 1949. Two operating companies were founded, each responsible for one half of the tunnel: the French Autoroutes et tunnel du Mont-Blanc (ATMB), founded on 30 April 1958, and the Italian Società italiana per azioni per il Traforo del Monte Bianco (SITMB), founded on 1 September 1957. Drilling began in 1959 and was completed in 1962; the tunnel was opened to traffic on 19 July 1965.

The passageway is not horizontal, but in a slightly inverted "V", which assists ventilation. The tunnel consists of a single gallery with a two-lane dual direction road. At the time of its construction, it was three times longer than any existing highway tunnel.

The tunnel passes almost exactly under the summit of the Aiguille du Midi. At this spot, it lies  beneath the surface, making it the world's second deepest operational tunnel after the Gotthard Base Tunnel.

The Mont Blanc Tunnel was originally managed by the two building companies. Following a fire in 1999 in which 39 people died, which showed how lack of coordination could hamper the safety of the tunnel, all the operations are managed by a single entity: MBT-EEIG, controlled by both ATMB and SITMB together, through a 50–50 shares distribution.

An alternative route for road traffic between France to Italy is the Fréjus Road Tunnel. Road traffic grew steadily until 1994, even with the opening of the Fréjus tunnel. Since then, the combined traffic volume of the former has remained roughly constant.

Construction statistics 
 Workforce: five engineers and 350 workmen worked an estimated grand total of 4.6 million man-hours to complete the project
 Explosives:  of explosives were used to blast  of rock

History 

The idea of building a tunnel underneath the Mont Blanc to avoid the need for lengthy circumnavigation dates back to the nineteenth century during the heyday of the railway. However, the idea did not receive widespread attention until 1907, when Francesco Farinet, a Member of Parliament of the Aosta Valley, advocated constructing of the tunnel. In 1908, a first design was presented by French engineer Arnold Monod, to much interest from Italian and French politicians.

Agreement between France and Italy and start of construction by 1959

Due to political turmoil and World War I and World War II, the project did not start until 1959,  when excavations on the tunnel officially began. This was preceded by the signing of a national charter for the tunnel construction, ratified by the parliaments of France (1957)  and Italy (1954). That same year, the STMB (Société du tunnel du Mont Blanc) was formed, which became ATMB (Autoroutes et Tunnel du Mont Blanc) in 1996. In 1962, the French and Italian drilling teams met on 4 August.

Opening 1965

Three years later the tunnel was inaugurated by the French president, Charles de Gaulle, and the Italian President, Giuseppe Saragat on 16 July 1965. The tunnel opened to traffic on 19 July. Surveillance cameras were installed in 1978.

Updates in the 1990s

The tunnel underwent extensive modernisation works in 1990, including the addition of safety features such new video surveillance cameras, 8 pressurized emergency shelters, a sprinkler system and other safety maintenance. In 1997, a fire detection system was installed along with centralized safety equipment management, and new variable message signs.

1999 Fire

On the morning of 24 March 1999, the engine of a Belgian transport truck carrying volatile freight caught fire in the tunnel.  The event expanded into a catastrophe which cost the lives of 39 people.

2002 Reopening

This led to a three-year tunnel closure until 9 March 2002. The reopening followed an extensive overhaul of the safety features.
The highway trunk from Aosta to the tunnel on the Italian side was completed in 2007.

Traffic 

In 2010, the average traffic volume was 4,945 vehicles per day, or around 1.80 million vehicles per year. In 2011, there were an average of 5,113 vehicles per day (about 1.87 million vehicles per year).

Although several lines of vehicles can queue up at the toll station, only a limited number of vehicles per unit time is allowed to transit the tunnel to ensure a safety distance between them.

Within the tunnel, a minimum speed of 50 km/h and a maximum speed of 70 km/h applies, while the prescribed distance between vehicles is 150 m; trucks are allowed to enter in groups of five. These security measures were taken as a consequence of the 1999 tunnel fire.

Pedestrians can cross the tunnel by bus; bicycles can also be carried through the tunnel with a reservation.

Toll 

The tunnel crossing is subject to a toll; the toll differs from Italy to France because of their different VAT rates.

In 2013, the one-way ticket for a car was  €40.90 (€41.40  on the Italian side), while the return ticket, valid for 7 days, was €51  (€51.60  on the Italian side). In 2016, the one-way ticket for a car cost €43.50  (€44.20  on the Italian side).

Mont Blanc Tunnel Tolls on the Italian side from 1 January 2022 (22% VAT included)

Mont Blanc Tunnel Tolls on the French side from 1 January 2022 (20% VAT included)

See also 

 National Geographic Seconds From Disaster episodes
 Mont Blanc tunnel fire

References

External links 

 
 "Traffic Tunnel to Pierce Mt Blanc." Popular Mechanics, April 1952, pp. 92–96. Detailed drawings of planned tunnel construction
 ATMB, Official Company Website 
 ATMB, Official Company Website 
 ATMB, Official Company Website 
 
 Chamonix-Mont-Blanc Map
 BBC story on fire trial

Road tunnels in France
Road tunnels in Italy
Transport in Aosta Valley
Tunnels in the Alps
France–Italy border crossings
Mont Blanc
Tunnels completed in 1965
Toll tunnels in Europe
1965 establishments in France
1965 establishments in Italy
1999 fires in Europe
March 1999 events in Europe
Transport in Courmayeur